James L. Buckley (born 1923) was a U.S. Senator from New York from 1971 to 1977. Senator Buckley may also refer to:

Anna Buckley (1924–2003), Massachusetts State Senate
John L. Buckley (1900–after 1948), New York State Senate
T. Garry Buckley (1922–2012), Vermont State Senate